Sukanaivalu Ivakuva Hufanga, known as Suka Hufanga (born Vaini, 18 June 1982), is a Tongan rugby union footballer. He plays as a centre.

Career
He played for CA Brive in the French Top 14, from 2006/07 to 2008/09. He plays for Newcastle Falcons in the English Premiership, since 2009/10.

The Tongan centre has 30 caps for his National Team, with 5 tries scored, 25 points in aggregate.

Hufanga has been in the Tongan squad since 2003. He was selected both for the 2003 Rugby World Cup finals, where he played three matches, and the 2007 Rugby World Cup finals, playing all the four matches. Hufanga scored two tries in the narrow losses to South Africa (25-30) and England (20-36). He was also called for the 2011 Rugby World Cup, playing in four games. He also scored a try in Tonga's historic win over France in the 2011 Rugby World Cup.

References

External links
Suka Hufanga Statistics

1982 births
Living people
Tongan rugby union players
Rugby union centres
CA Brive players
Expatriate rugby union players in France
Tonga international rugby union players
Expatriate rugby union players in England
Tongan expatriate sportspeople in France
Tongan expatriate sportspeople in England
Tongan expatriate rugby union players
People from Tongatapu